KZKR (105.1 FM) is a radio station airing a classic rock format licensed to Jonesville, Louisiana. The station is owned by Listen Up Yall Media LLC.

References

External links
KZKR's official website

Classic rock radio stations in the United States
Radio stations in Louisiana